The thirteenth season of Deutschland sucht den Superstar was broadcast on German channel RTL from 2 January to 7 May 2016. It was won by Prince Damien Ritzinger.

History
During the live shows of season 12, it was announced that the castings for season 13 would start in August 2015. In late 2014, RTL gave closer details to the changes of season 13. The live shows are replaced with pre-recorded concerts in clubs in Germany. Only the announcement of the results will be broadcast live. Like the season before, the final will not take place in a TV studio in Cologne, but in the ISS Dome in Düsseldorf.

In 2015, RTL announced that DJ Antoine, Mandy Capristo, and Heino won't return for the thirteenth season. The new jury consists of Dieter Bohlen, H.P. Baxxter, Michelle and Vanessa Mai. Prince Damien Ritzinger was announced as the winner on 7 May 2016, with Laura van den Elzen finishing as the runner-up.

Auditions and "Recall" 
Start of the season was on Saturday, 2 January 2016. In the casting rounds, each candidate selected before the show from a Golden CD with the name of the juror, whose voice should be the deciding factor for advancement or leaving a draw jury voting. Menderes reached the fourth time the "Recall". There is a "Quick Pick" was held where each candidate had to sing again. RTL did not broadcast this Germany-Recall. Instead, only a short scene was shown in which piles announced that the 32 pre-worn Recall of the 110 candidates in Thailand-Recall were.

"Re-recall"
The Recall in Jamaica was reached by 16 women and 16 men. The contestants were separated into three to four groups by each gender for the first four performances. In the last round, the remaining contestants sang in duets where afterward the judges then decided the Top 10.

Finalists
The finalist was announced on 9 April and consisted of six male and four (five) female contestants.

 Angelika Turo who originally made it to the Top 10 left the competition on 14 April after she announced her pregnancy. Ramona Mihajilovic than took her place.

Event shows
The event shows were held from 16 April to 7 May 2016 with three pre-recorded shows and a live final. The voting results were published right after the final.

Color key

Top 10 - Merkers Adventure Mines
Original airdate: 16 April 2016
The first event show was held in Merkers Adventure Mines and was pre-recorded on 13 April 2016. The live result show at Eberbach Abbey was aired directly after the event show. At the beginning of the show, it was announced that only one contestant would leave the show this week. Also, Angelika Turo performed out of competition at the end of the show.

 Group performance: "Proper Education"

Top 9 - German Songs - Eberbach Abbey
Original airdate: 23 April 2016 
The second event show was held in the Eberbach Abbey and will be pre-recorded on 20 April 2016. The live result show at Landschaftspark Duisburg-Nord was aired directly after the event show. Contestant Sandra Berger married her fiancé during the live show. Also, this week, every contestant had to perform a German song. The three contestants with the fewest votes were eliminated.

 Group performance: "Geiles Leben" - Glasperlenspiel

Top 6 - Semi-final - Landschaftspark Duisburg-Nord
Original airdate: 30 April 2016 
The third event show was held in the Landschaftspark Duisburg-Nord and was pre-recorded on 27 April 2016. The live result show in ISS Dome was aired directly after the event show. Also, the six contestants had to perform in pairs in duets or as it was billed 'duells'. The three contestants with the fewest votes were eliminated.

 Group performance: "Get Down Saturday Night" - Oliver Cheatham & "Wir heben ab"

Top 3 - Final - Düsseldorf
Original airdate: 7 May 2016
The Final was held live in Düsseldorf at the ISS Dome in front of 13,000 people on 7 May 2016. One Contestant was eliminated after the first performance. The other two performed their favorite performance and the winner's single.

Round 1

Round 2

Thomas Katrozan would have performed "Sexy" by Marius Müller-Westernhagen and "Glücksmoment".

Elimination chart

Angelika Turo, who originally made it to the Top 10, left the competition on 14 April after announcing her pregnancy. Ramona Mihajilovic took her place.

References

External links 
 Official website

Season 13
2016 in German music
2016 German television seasons